The Opéra royal de Wallonie (French; "Royal Opera of Wallonia") is an opera house located on the Place de l'Opéra, in Liège, Belgium. Together with La Monnaie and the Vlaamse Opera, the Opéra royal, as it is colloquially known, is one of the three major opera houses in Belgium. From the beginning, the institution occupied the Théâtre royal in Liège, a building loaned by the city (inaugurated on 4 November 1820).

History

Early history
In 1816, King William I of the Netherlands transferred the land and materials of the former Dominican convent to the city of Liège, on condition that a theatre be built there.

The first stone was laid on 1 July 1818 by Mademoiselle Mars. Built according to the plan of the architect Auguste Dukers, the theatre in the neoclassical style has a massive parallelepipedic shape. Its main façade is decorated with a marble colonnade limited by a balustrade and overlooking the arcades on the ground floor. The Théâtre royal de Liège was inaugurated on 4 November 1820.

The city became the owner in 1854. The statue in front of the building represents the Liège composer André Grétry and is the work of the sculptor Guillaume Geefs. The musician's heart was placed in the base of the statue in 1842. In 1861, the architect Julien-Étienne Rémont profoundly transformed the room and the building, which was several metres long at the back and sides. The new Second Empire style hall could then accommodate more than 1,500 spectators.

The First World War was a difficult period for the opera: in August 1914, the building was requisitioned by the German army to serve as a stable and dormitory, and it was not until October 1919 that it reopened. The Exposition internationale de Liège, in 1930, was the occasion for the definitive installation of a vast pediment with a set of allegorical figures, sculpted on the façade by Oscar Berchmans. In the same year, the city proceeded to remove the façades, which lost their white plaster. The building was spared during the Second World War.

In 1967, the troupe of the Opéra royal de Wallonie was created, on the basis of the former opera company of the Théâtre royal de Liège and that of Verviers. It is constituted as a non-profit association, initially comprising the cities of Liège and Verviers. The Ministry of National Education and French Culture of the time was financially involved shortly afterwards. During the communitarisation, the Opéra royal de Wallonie became part of the French Community of Belgium, which compensated for the impecuniosity of the city in 1990, and has since been its main source of funding. A few years later, the City, Liège Province and the Walloon Region gradually took over its financing.

The building was classified as a monument by Wallonia by decree of 18 March 1999.

Renovation

The building underwent a major renovation from March 2009 to September 2012, both exterior and interior. The historic parts have been restored to their original state (large foyer, main staircase and hall). Its showroom (capacity 1,041 seats), Italian-style and its stage machinery make it one of the most modern theatres in the world.

The building was also expanded. An ultramodern structure has been installed in height in order to increase the height of the stage cage, and is equipped with a so-called multi-purpose room (Raymond Rossius Room) that can accommodate smaller shows, rehearsals or symposiums, conferences, and workshops. The renovation plans were prepared as a collaboration among three architectural firms, A2RC, Aa Architectes associés and Origin Architecture et Engineering.

From November 2009 until the end of the construction period, performances were held at the "Palais Opéra": a tent temporarily erected on the Bavarian Hospital space.

The renovated Opéra Royal de Wallonia was inaugurated on 19 September 2012, with a performance of César Franck's Stradella (1841), staged here for the first time, in a production by Jaco Van Dormael, in the presence of the Belgian heir couple, Philippe and Mathilde.

Structure

Management
In 2006, the French Community's subsidy to the Opera was €12,672,000, of which nearly two thirds are paid in salaries, since it employs more than three hundred people.

The capacity of the hall is 1,044 seats.

The troupe of the Opéra royal de Wallonie has had as successive directors:
 1967–1992: Raymond Rossius (1926–2005)
 1992–1996: Paul Danblon (born 1931)
 1996–2007: Jean-Louis Grinda (born 1960)
 2007–2021: Stefano Mazzonis di Pralafera (1948–2021)

From 2007 until 2021, the Director General of the company was Stefano Mazzonis di Pralafera. He was also the artistic director. Previous music directors of the company have included Paolo Arrivabeni (2008–2017) and Speranza Scappucci (2017–2022), the first female music director and principal conductor in the history of the company. She stood down as music director at the close of the 2021–22 season. In January 2022, the company announced the appointment of Giampaolo Bisanti as its next music director, effective with the 2022–23 season.

The Opéra royal de Wallonie is a member of the Réseau européen pour la sensibilisation à l'opéra et à la danse (RESEO) and Opera Europa.

Orchestra and choir of the Opéra royal de Wallonie

In addition to its in-house performances, the orchestra and the choir also perform abroad, such as at the Balbeeck International Festival and the Santander Festival.

Ballet of the Opéra royal de Wallonie
Founded at the same time as the opera company, the ballet of the Opéra royal de Wallonie was created in 1967. Essentially interpreting the entertainment in the classical lyrical repertoire, the ballet is gradually moving towards greater autonomy and a neoclassical style. Drastic budgetary restrictions forced the Board of Directors to dissolve the ballet in 1997.

The ballet has had André Leclair, Gigi Caciuleanu and Jacques Dombrowski as its members. Among the danseurs étoiles, are Ambra Vallo, nowadays Principal at the Royal Ballet.

Workshops
Since its creation in 1967, one of the major strengths of the Opéra royal de Wallonie has been to operate as an independent entity. This is why, in the 1970s, the company set up its own set and costume making workshops. The buildings that house the various trades were, at that time, located in various parts of the city.

During the 1996–97 season, when the colossal sets and costumes for La traviata were created, new needs became apparent, to address the lack of space and functionality of the then-existing facilities. Thus, the Opéra royal de Wallonie decided to centralise its production departments in a single site, at Ans, in June 2002.

Studio Marcel Désiron
Until 2003, the orchestra rehearsed in the basement of the Royal Theatre.

In 2002, the transfer of the set design workshops to their new installations in Ans freed the buildings from the rue des Tawes in Liège. The former set assembly hall presented a new opportunity in terms of volume and asymmetry (non-parallel walls, multi-paned roof).

An acoustic study was commissioned and demonstrated the feasibility of the project. The objective was to carry out the work so that the musicians could rehearse in 2003.

Since the 2003–04 season, all orchestra rehearsals have been held in this space, which can accommodate nearly 120 musicians. If this place is primarily reserved for music, it can also be transformed into a stage production studio, if necessary.

Anecdotes
 In 2013, the theatre hosted the shooting of the film A Promise by Patrice Leconte.

Notes and references

Notes

References

Bibliography

External links

 Official website of the Opéra royal de Wallonie
 Visite interactive de l'opéra royal de Wallonie (Google)

Opera houses in Belgium
Theatres in Liège
Tourist attractions in Liège Province
Theatres completed in 1820
Music venues completed in 1820
Organisations based in Belgium with royal patronage